Pomasia lamunin is a moth in the family Geometridae. It is found on Borneo. The species is found from lowland areas to the lower montane zone.

The length of the forewings is about 8 mm.

References

Moths described in 1997
Eupitheciini